The following outline is provided as an overview of and topical guide to Cambodia:

Cambodia – a sovereign country located in Southeast Asia with a population of over 13 million people.  Cambodia is the successor state of the once powerful Hindu and Buddhist Khmer Empire, which ruled most of the Indochinese Peninsula between the eleventh and fourteenth centuries. Cambodia's main industries are garments, tourism, and construction. In 2007, foreign visitors to Angkor Wat alone almost hit the 4 million mark.

General reference

 Pronunciation: 
 Common English country name: Cambodia
 Official English country name: Kingdom of Cambodia
 Common endonym(s): Kampuchea
 Official endonym(s): Kampuchea
 Adjectival(s): Cambodian
 Demonym(s): Cambodian
 Etymology: Name of Cambodia
 ISO country codes: KH, KHM, 116
 ISO region codes: See ISO 3166-2:KH
 Internet country code top-level domain: .kh

Geography of Cambodia 

Geography of Cambodia
 Cambodia is: a country
 Location:
 Northern Hemisphere and Eastern Hemisphere
 Eurasia
 Asia
 South East Asia
 Indochina
 Time zone: UTC+07
 Extreme points of Cambodia
 High:  Phnom Aural 
 Low:  Gulf of Thailand 0 m
 Land boundaries:  2,572 km
 1,228 km
 803 km
 541 km
 Coastline:  443 km
 Population of Cambodia: 15,552,211 - 73rd most populous country

 Area of Cambodia:  - 88th largest country
 Atlas of Cambodia

Environment of Cambodia 

 Climate of Cambodia
 Protected areas of Cambodia
 Wildlife of Cambodia
 Fauna of Cambodia
 Birds of Cambodia
 Mammals of Cambodia

Natural geographic features of Cambodia 

 Islands of Cambodia
 Lakes of Cambodia
 Mountains of Cambodia
 Volcanoes in Cambodia
 Rivers of Cambodia
 List of World Heritage Sites in Cambodia

Regions of Cambodia 

Regions of Cambodia

Ecoregions of Cambodia 

List of ecoregions in Cambodia

Administrative divisions of Cambodia 

Administrative divisions of Cambodia
 Provinces of Cambodia
 Districts of Cambodia

Provinces of Cambodia 

Provinces of Cambodia

Districts of Cambodia 

Districts of Cambodia

Municipalities of Cambodia 

Municipalities of Cambodia
 Capital of Cambodia: Phnom Penh
 Cities of Cambodia

Demography of Cambodia 

Demographics of Cambodia

Government and politics of Cambodia 

Politics of Cambodia
 Form of government: parliamentary representative democratic monarchy
 Capital of Cambodia: Phnom Penh
 Elections in Cambodia
 Political parties in Cambodia

Branches of government

Executive branch of the government of Cambodia 
 Head of state: King of Cambodia
 Head of government: Prime Minister of Cambodia
 Cabinet of Cambodia

Legislative branch of the government of Cambodia 

 Parliament of Cambodia (bicameral)
 Upper house: Senate of Cambodia
 Lower house: National Assembly of Cambodia

Judicial branch of the government of Cambodia 

Court system of Cambodia

Foreign relations of Cambodia 

Foreign relations of Cambodia
 Diplomatic missions in Cambodia
 Diplomatic missions of Cambodia

International organization membership 
The Kingdom of Cambodia is a member of:

Asian Development Bank (ADB)
Asia-Pacific Telecommunity (APT)
Association of Southeast Asian Nations (ASEAN)
Association of Southeast Asian Nations Regional Forum (ARF)
East Asia Summit (EAS)
Food and Agriculture Organization (FAO)
Group of 77 (G77)
International Bank for Reconstruction and Development (IBRD)
International Civil Aviation Organization (ICAO)
International Criminal Court (ICCt)
International Criminal Police Organization (Interpol)
International Development Association (IDA)
International Federation of Red Cross and Red Crescent Societies (IFRCS)
International Finance Corporation (IFC)
International Fund for Agricultural Development (IFAD)
International Labour Organization (ILO)
International Maritime Organization (IMO)
International Monetary Fund (IMF)
International Olympic Committee (IOC)
International Organization for Migration (IOM)
International Organization for Standardization (ISO) (subscriber)

International Red Cross and Red Crescent Movement (ICRM)
International Telecommunications Satellite Organization (ITSO)
Inter-Parliamentary Union (IPU)
Multilateral Investment Guarantee Agency (MIGA)
Nonaligned Movement (NAM)
Organisation internationale de la Francophonie (OIF)
Organisation for the Prohibition of Chemical Weapons (OPCW)
Permanent Court of Arbitration (PCA)
United Nations (UN)
United Nations Conference on Trade and Development (UNCTAD)
United Nations Educational, Scientific, and Cultural Organization (UNESCO)
United Nations Industrial Development Organization (UNIDO)
United Nations Mission in the Sudan (UNMIS)
Universal Postal Union (UPU)
World Customs Organization (WCO)
World Federation of Trade Unions (WFTU)
World Health Organization (WHO)
World Intellectual Property Organization (WIPO)
World Meteorological Organization (WMO)
World Tourism Organization (UNWTO)
World Trade Organization (WTO)

Law and order in Cambodia 

Law of Cambodia
 Constitution of Cambodia
 Crime in Cambodia
 Human rights in Cambodia
 LGBT rights in Cambodia
 Freedom of religion in Cambodia
 Law enforcement in Cambodia

Military of Cambodia 

Military of Cambodia
 Command
 Commander-in-chief:
 Ministry of Defence of Cambodia
 Forces
 Army of Cambodia
 Navy of Cambodia
 Air Force of Cambodia
 Military history of Cambodia

Local government in Cambodia 

Local government in Cambodia

History of Cambodia 

History of Cambodia
 Early history of Cambodia
 Funan
 Chenla
 Khmer Empire
 Economic history of Cambodia
 Military history of Cambodia

Culture of Cambodia 

Culture of Cambodia
 Architecture of Cambodia
 Rural Khmer house
 Cuisine of Cambodia
 Languages of Cambodia
 Media in Cambodia
 National symbols of Cambodia
 Coat of arms of Cambodia
 Flag of Cambodia
 National anthem of Cambodia
 People of Cambodia
 Prostitution in Cambodia
 Public holidays in Cambodia
 Religion in Cambodia
 Buddhism in Cambodia
 Christianity in Cambodia
 Hinduism in Cambodia
 Islam in Cambodia
 List of World Heritage Sites in Cambodia

The arts in Cambodia 
 Cinema of Cambodia
 Literature of Cambodia
 Music of Cambodia

Sports in Cambodia 

Sports in Cambodia
 Football in Cambodia
 Cambodia at the Olympics
 Cambodian martial art
Bokator
Kbachkun boraan
Kbachkun Dambong-veng
Khmer traditional wrestling
Pradal Serey

Economy and infrastructure of Cambodia 

Economy of Cambodia
 Economic rank, by nominal GDP (2007): 120th (one hundred and twentieth)
 Agriculture in Cambodia
 Banking in Cambodia
 National Bank of Cambodia
 Communications in Cambodia
 Internet in Cambodia
 Companies of Cambodia
Currency of Cambodia: Riel
ISO 4217: KHR
 Economic history of Cambodia
 Energy in Cambodia
 Health care in Cambodia
 Mining in Cambodia
 Cambodia Stock Exchange
 Tourism in Cambodia
 Transport in Cambodia
 Airports in Cambodia
 Rail transport in Cambodia

Education in Cambodia 

Education in Cambodia

Health in Cambodia 

Health in Cambodia

See also 

Cambodia

Index of Cambodia-related articles
List of Cambodia-related topics
List of international rankings
Member state of the United Nations
Outline of Asia
Outline of geography

References

External links

Official
 King of Cambodia, Norodom Sihanouk Official Website of former King Norodom Sihanouk
 Cambodia.gov.kh Official Royal Government of Cambodia Website (English Version)
 Ministry of Foreign Affairs and International Cooperation

Overviews
 Cambodia. The World Factbook. Central Intelligence Agency.
 Congressional Research Service (CRS) Reports regarding Cambodia
 Sharing Growth: Equity and Development in Cambodia - a report by the World Bank, launched on June 12, 2007 at the Cambodia Development Cooperation Forum (CDCF)
 Cambodia Country Factsheet from The Common Language Project

Other
 Cambodia Tribunal Monitor
 CMDGs - Cambodia Millennium Development Goals
 
 

Cambodia